Jalan Pinggiran Batu Caves (Selangor state route B125) is a major roads in Klang Valley region, Selangor, Malaysia

List of junctions

Roads in Selangor